Cleebronn is a municipality in the district of Heilbronn in Baden-Württemberg in southern Germany.

Geography 
The landscape is characterised by wine-growing.

Neighbouring municipalities 
Neighbouring towns of Cleebronn are (clockwise from the west): Güglingen, Brackenheim (both in the district of Heilbronn), Bönnigheim and Sachsenheim (both in the district of Ludwigsburg). Cleebronn has combined with Brackenheim to form a joint association.

Municipal structure 
Cleebronn includes the villages of Treffentrill and Katharinenplaisir.

History 
The first documented mention of Cleebronn was in 1279 as Kleberen. In the 13th century there were some possessions of the Principality of Mainz around the Michaelsberg being rented to Cleebronn's Lords of Magenheim.

In the 14th century Württemberg acquired around two-thirds of the village as Württembergisch Cleebronn. The other third stayed in the possession of the principality as Mainzisch Cleebronn. In 1785 Württemberg acquired this last third, but stayed independent. These municipalities which independent until 1843 were called Alt-Cleebronn and Neu-Cleebronn until 1811. These two remaining parts were not united with the rest until January 1, 1844.

Cleebronn has a Protestant parish.

Politics

District council 
The district council of Cleebronn has 12 seats.

The mayor is also a member of the district council and its chairman.

Culture and sights

Notable buildings 
 The Protestant Raphaelskirche has Gothic parts and was redeveloped in 1900–01. Next to the church is the old vicarage.
 The current town hall was built in 1736 and has been redeveloped several times.
 The Bürgerhaus was built in 1902 as a school instead of the old town hall. The school ended in 1994, until it was modernised in 1997.
 The wine-press of the village dates from 1907 and formerly was the biggest wine-press of Württemberg.
 The Backhaus was built in 1930 and redeveloped in 1985; it contains two functional ovens.
 Above the village on a hill is Magenheim Castle, which the Staufers built in 1250, formerly seat of the Lords of Magenheim.
 On the Michaelsberg there is a Romanic church and a spital of 1739 (today's youth hostel).
 The hamlet Katharinenplaisir is a Baroque estate built in 1733 and named after the builder's wife.
A telecommunications tower was built on it in 1969.

Economy and infrastructure

Wine-growing 
On the Michaelsberg vines have been grown for 1200 years. There are different varietals like blaufränkisch, trollinger, riesling and Kerner. Most wine-growers belong to the Weingärtnergenossenschaft Weingärtner Cleebronn-Güglingen eG.

Transportation
There are connections to the long-distance rail network via Lauffen and Kirchheim (B 27). Public transport is provided by buses of the HNV. The Zabergäubahn, being shut down for several years, has a station in the neighbouring Frauenzimmern.

Local businesses 
A well-known employer is Zink Feuerwerk GmbH, producing fireworks. Founded in 1949, the company originated in an older company with fireworks founded in 1852. It is one of the last producers of fireworks in Germany and produces both rockets and big fireworks, with 20 employees. Both the founder Paul Zink and his son and successor Walter became honorary citizens of Cleebronn.

Media 
The daily paper Heilbronner Stimme south-west edition has local news.

Education 
The primary school Friedrich-Hölderlin-Grundschule in Cleebronn has had a new building since 1994. Secondary schools are situated in Cleebronn's neighbouring towns. There are two kindergartens held by the Protestant church. Also, Cleebronn has a small library within its Bürgerhaus as well as a separate book store selling used books.

Leisure 
 
Below the Michaelsberg is the Erlebnispark Tripsdrill. Next to it is the Wildparadies Stromberg (wildlife park). On a surface of  there are around 100 attractions, zoological institutions and museums to visit. Near the park is the tennis ground of the TC Cleebronn, which has five tennis courts to play and a further one to play beach-volleyball.

Sons of the community 

 Sigismund Wilhelm Koelle (1820-1902), missionary and linguistic researcher
 Carl Krauch (1853-1934), chemist

References

External links 
 www.cleebronn.de (in German)

Heilbronn (district)
Württemberg